The 2017 North American Indigenous Games were held in Toronto, Ontario, Canada July 16 to 23. The event featured 5,000 athletes aged 13 to 19 in 14 sports.

Bidding process
The 2017 North American Indigenous Games bidding process began on January 12, 2015 and Toronto submitted its bid on January 30, 2015. The bid to host the Games in Toronto, led by the Aboriginal Sport & Wellness Council of Ontario and the Mississaugas of New Credit First Nation, received unanimous support from the NAIG's International Governing Body. The Games was awarded to Toronto on June 26, 2015 after bids from other cities did not materialize.

Funding
The total budget for the Games was $11 million. Three levels of government provided funding to the 2017 North American Indigenous Games. Government of Canada provided $3.5 million through Sport Canada and Government of Ontario provided $3.5 million in matching funding. City of Toronto contributed $400,000 funding. Other major sponsors included Hydro One, Rogers Communication and Unifor.

Broadcasting rights
CBC provided 100 hours of live and on-demand streaming for competitions and opening ceremony. Indigenous groups and academia called the absence of live TV coverage due to lack of funding as "unfortunate".

Venues

Aviva Centre - North York, Toronto (Opening ceremony)
Dan Lang Field - Scarborough, Toronto (Baseball)
Gaylord Powless Arena - Ohsweken, Ontario (Lacrosse)
Hamilton Angling & Hunting Association - Ancaster, Ontario (3-D Archery)
Harry Howell Arena - Waterdown, Ontario (Lacrosse)
HoopDome - North York, Toronto (Basketball)
Humber Athletics & Recreation Centre - Etobicoke, Toronto (Basketball, Volleyball)
Humber Valley Golf Course - Etobicoke, Toronto (Golf)
Iroquois Lacrosse Arena - Hagersville, Ontario (Lacrosse)
Ron Joyce Stadium - Hamilton, Ontario (Soccer)
Tait McKenzie Centre - North York, Toronto (Basketball, Volleyball)
Toronto International Trap & Skeet Club - Cookstown, Ontario (Rifle shooting)
Toronto Pan Am Sports Centre - Scarborough, Toronto (Badminton, Swimming)
Toronto Track & Field Centre - North York, Toronto (Wrestling)
Turner Park - Hamilton, Ontario (Softball)
University of Toronto Scarborough Valley - Scarborough, Toronto (Cross Country)
Welland International Flatwater Centre - Welland, Ontario (Canoe/Kayak)
York Lions Stadium - North York, Toronto (Athletics)
York University - North York, Toronto (Closing ceremony)

Sports

3D Archery
Athletics
Badminton
Baseball
Basketball
Canoe/Kayak
Golf
Lacrosse
Rifle shooting
Soccer
Softball
Swimming
Volleyball
Wrestling

Calendar

Source:

Participating regions

 (319)
 (447)
 (29)
 (100)
 (9)
 (313)
 (83)
 (445)
 (43)
 (72)
 (96)
 (93)
 (187)
 (242)
 (192)
 (77)
 (441)
 (27)
 (432)
 (131)
 (288)
 (195)

Medal table

Medal summary

References

External links
Official site

2017 in multi-sport events
2017 in North American sport
International sports competitions in Toronto
2017 in Canadian sports
Sports competitions in Toronto
Multi-sport events in Canada
2017 in Toronto
July 2017 sports events in Canada
Indigenous sports and games of the Americas
Indigenous peoples of North America
Youth sport in Canada